Roberto Conti (born 16 December 1964) is an Italian former road cyclist, whose biggest win came in the 1994 Tour de France as he won the Alpe D'Huez stage after an impressive break-away. His professional career ended in 2003.

Career achievements

Major results

1985
 5th GP Capodarco
1987
 1st  Young rider classification Giro d'Italia
1988
 8th Giro di Toscana
1989
 8th Giro di Toscana
1990
 3rd Trofeo dello Scalatore
 10th Coppa Placci
1991
 1st Stage 2 (TTT) Tour de France
1992
 2nd Overall Giro del Trentino
 7th Giro di Toscana
 9th Overall Giro d'Italia
 10th Gran Premio Città di Camaiore
1993
 5th Giro di Toscana
 6th Giro del Friuli
1994
 3rd Overall Grand Prix du Midi Libre
 6th Overall Tour de France
1st Stage 16
 8th Gran Premio Città di Camaiore
1997
 4th Subida a Urkiola
 5th Gran Premio Città di Camaiore
 10th Overall Tour de France
1999
 1st Giro della Romagna
 6th Giro del Piemonte
 8th Trofeo dello Scalatore
 8th Firenze–Pistoia
 9th Gran Premio Bruno Beghelli

Grand Tour general classification results timeline

External links

1964 births
Living people
Italian male cyclists
Italian Tour de France stage winners
Sportspeople from the Province of Ravenna
Cyclists from Emilia-Romagna